= Hannah White and Sons =

Welsh publisher and bookseller

- Formerly: John White and Sons, Hannah White and Son, Messrs White and Sons
- Industry: publisher, bookseller, book-binder, printer, library, reading room, stationer
- Founded: 1809 in Carmarthen, Wales
- Defunct: 1861
- Fate: Sold at auction
- Headquarters: 50 King Street, Carmarthen

Hannah White and Sons was a publisher, bookseller and library at 50 King Street in Carmarthen, South Wales, between 1809 and 1861.

== History ==
John White and his wife Hannah moved to Carmarthen in 1803 from Somerset. John White was a schoolmaster, founding a school on Priory Street, Carmarthen. He then relocated to the Writing, Commercial and Mathematical School on King Street, Carmarthen.

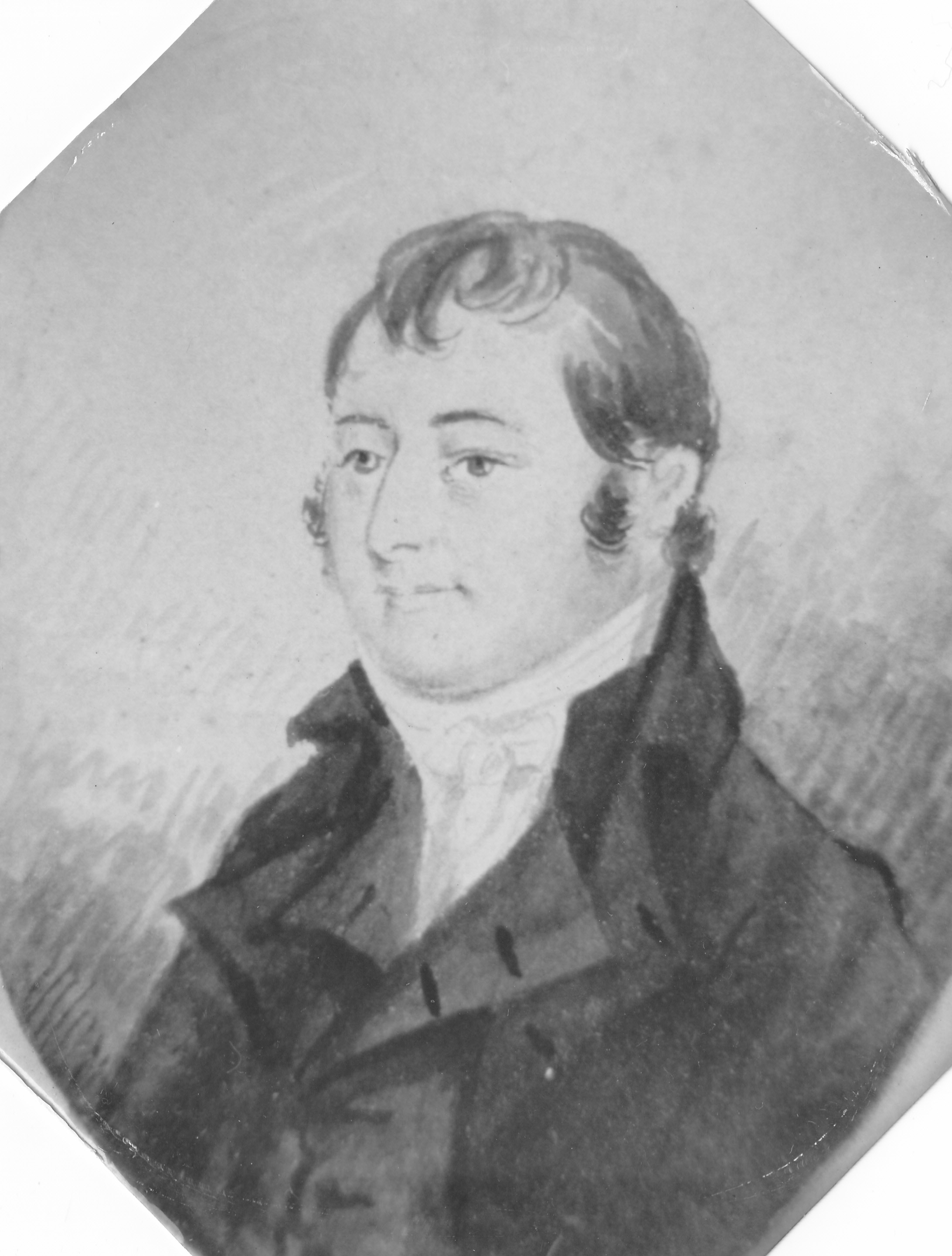
Portrait of John White (1762–1818)

=== John White and Sons (1809–1818) ===
In 1809, John White founded a book publisher called "John White and Sons".

The same year the printing office of J. White and Sons, Carmarthen, printed a second edition of John White's teaching manual called The Teacher’s Ease and The Scholar’s Help, which was originally published in 1796.

In 1815, a reading room and library was added to the printing office.

John White died in 1818, leaving Hannah and their eight children.

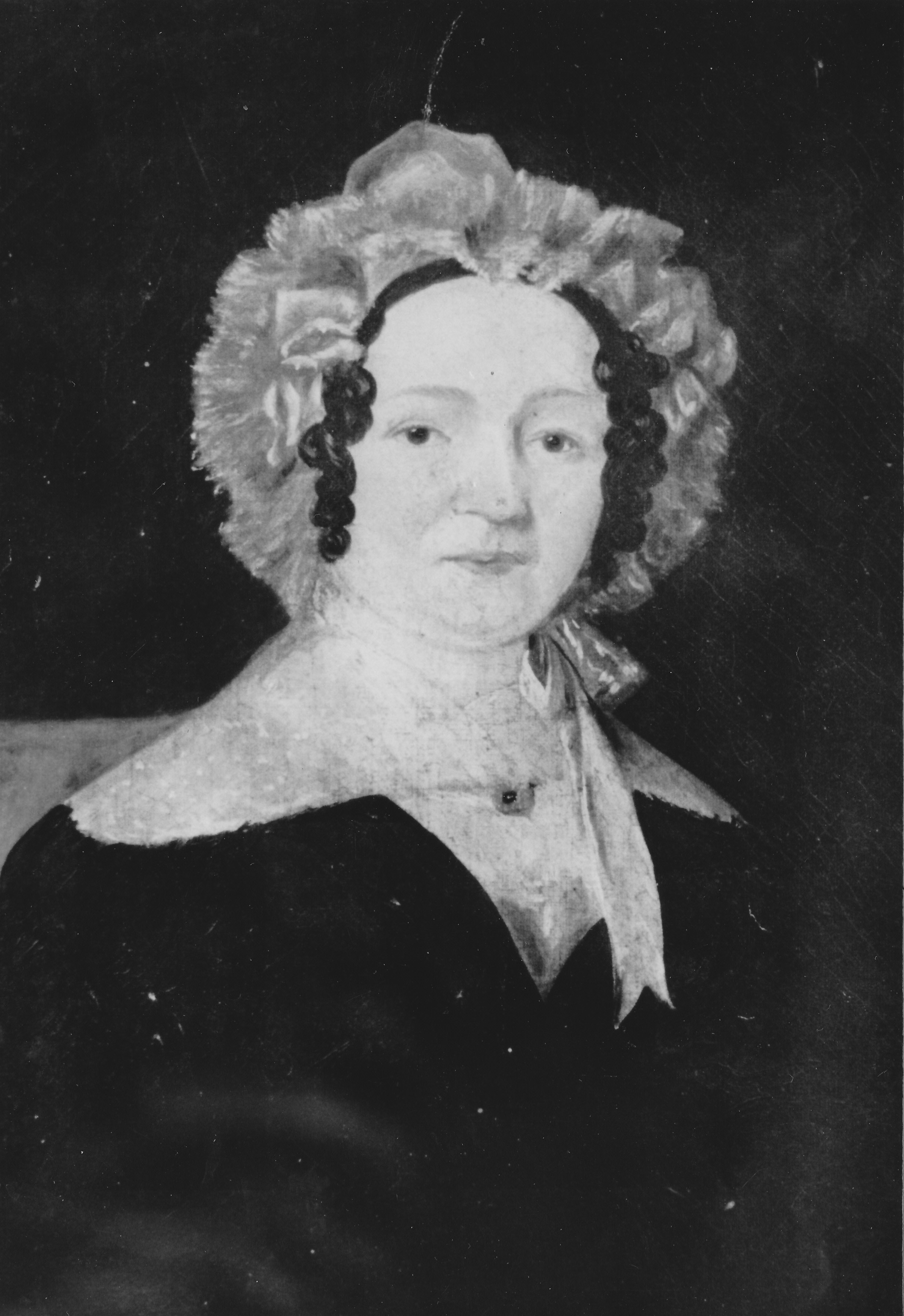
Portrait of Hannah White (1781–1861)

=== Hannah White and Sons (1818–1861) ===
After her husband's death, Hannah White began trading under the name "Hannah White and Sons". The business also sold stationery, perfume and toys.

Two of John and Hannah's sons, George and Isaac, became partners in the business.

After Hannah's death in 1861, George and Isaac retired, and the business was sold at auction.

== Legacy ==
The Carmarthen Civic Society put up a blue plaque commemorating Hannah White and Sons on the site of the former premises.
